"Owl Creek Quickstep" was a song written by American songwriter Dan Emmett. The title refers to one of the earliest settlements in Knox County, Ohio.  It was commonly sung by blackface minstrels.

References

 Sacks, Howard L, and Sacks, Judith (1993). Way up North in Dixie: A Black Family's Claim to the Confederate Anthem. Washington: Smithsonian Institution Press.

Blackface minstrel songs
19th-century songs
Songs written by Dan Emmett
Year of song missing